The Mayor of Dire Dawa  is head of the executive branch of Dire Dawa's municipal government. Kedir Juhar currently serves as the mayor of Dire Dawa since 29 September 2021. The Dire Dawa mayorship was inaugurated in 1981 with the position that has five years office terms.

The mayor has official title called "Chairman" and "Chief Administrator"

List of mayors
 Abebe Eshete: 1981 – 1991
 Habtamu Assefa Wakjira: 1991 – 1993
 Ismail Aw Aden: 1993 – 1995
 Solomon Hailu: 1995 – 2003
 Fisseha Zerihun: 2003 – 2006
 Abdulaziz Mohammed: 7 August 2006 - 2008
 Adem Farah: June 2008 – 2010
 Asad Ziad: June 2010 – 2015
 Ibrahim Uthman: June 2015 – 2021
 Kedir Juhar: 29 September 2021 –present

References

Dire Dawa
Governors of regions of Ethiopia